Petya Lukanova (born 20 July 1969) is a Bulgarian sports shooter. She competed in the Women's 10 metre air rifle and Women's 50 metre rifle three positions events at the 2012 Summer Olympics, finishing in 40th in the 10 metre event and 30th in the 50 metre event.

References

1969 births
Living people
Bulgarian female sport shooters
Olympic shooters of Bulgaria
Shooters at the 2012 Summer Olympics
Sportspeople from Pazardzhik